The 1940 Winter Olympics, which would have been officially known as the  and as Sapporo 1940 (札幌1940), were to have been celebrated from 3 to 12 February 1940 in Sapporo, Japan, but the games were eventually cancelled due to the onset of World War II. Sapporo subsequently hosted the 1972 Winter Olympics, becoming the first city in Asia to host the Winter Olympics.

History
Sapporo was selected to be the host of the fifth edition of the Winter Olympics, scheduled 3–12 February 1940, but Japan gave the Games back to the IOC in July 1938, after the outbreak of the Second Sino-Japanese War in 1937.
The IOC then decided to give the Winter Olympics to St. Moritz, Switzerland, which had hosted it in 1928. However, the Swiss organizers believed that ski instructors should be considered professionals. The IOC was not of that mind, and the Games were withdrawn again.

In June 1939, the IOC gave the 1940 Winter Olympics, now scheduled for 2–11 February, to Garmisch-Partenkirchen, Germany, where the previous Games had been held. Five months later, on 1 September, Germany invaded Poland, initiating the European theatre of World War II, and the Winter Games were cancelled in November. Likewise, the 1944 Games, awarded in 1939 to Cortina d'Ampezzo, Italy, were cancelled in 1941.  St. Moritz held the first post-war games in 1948, while Cortina d'Ampezzo hosted in 1956. 

Germany has not hosted the Winter Olympics since 1936: on 6 July 2011; Munich lost to Pyeongchang, South Korea to host the 2018 Winter Games.

See also

References

External links 
 Planned program for the V Winter Olympics in Sapporo and Garmisch-Partenkirchen

 
Cancelled Olympic Games
Events cancelled due to World War II
Olympic Games in Japan
Olympic Games in Germany
Olympic Games in Switzerland
1940 in multi-sport events
Winter Olympics by year
Sport in Sapporo
Sport in St. Moritz
Sport in Garmisch-Partenkirchen
1940 in Japanese sport
1940 in Swiss sport
1940 in German sport